Paritatodon is an extinct mammal which existed in Kyrgyzstan and England during the Jurassic period. It was originally the holotype specimen of Shuotherium kermacki, but Martin and Averianov (2010) argued that it resembled the genus Itatodon (Docodonta) and so renamed it Paritatodon.

Nonetheless, some recent phylogenetic studies assign it (and Itatodon) to Shuotheriidae, while others continue to consider the taxon a docodont.

Like many Mesozoic mammals, this species is only known from its teeth, in this case two lower molars from the Forest Marble Formation in England, and a single left lower molar from the Balabansai Formation in the Fergana Depression, Kyrgyzstan.

References

Bathonian life
Callovian life
Middle Jurassic mammals of Asia
Fossils of Kyrgyzstan
Middle Jurassic mammals of Europe
Jurassic England
Fossils of England
Fossil taxa described in 2010
Taxa named by Thomas Martin (paleontologist)
Taxa named by Alexander O. Averianov
Prehistoric mammal genera